Harsh Vardhan Shringla (born 1962) is Chief Coordinator for India’s G20 Presidency in 2023. He has previously served as Foreign Secretary of India, Ambassador to USA, High Commissioner to Bangladesh and Ambassador to Thailand.

Educational background
Harsh Vardhan Shringla graduated from the St. Stephen's College, Delhi University after being schooled at Mayo College, Ajmer. He worked in the private and public sectors in India prior to joining the Indian Foreign Service. He has published papers on conflict prevention, economic diplomacy, the Indian diaspora, and India-Bangladesh relations.

Diplomatic career
Ambassador Shringla joined the IFS in 1984 and in the course of a diplomatic career spanning over 35 years, he held a variety of positions in the Ministry of External Affairs (India), New Delhi and abroad besides becoming India's Ambassador/High Commissioner to the USA, Bangladesh and Thailand. Abroad, he served in different Missions of India in France (UNESCO); Permanent Mission to the United Nations in New York; Vietnam (Hanoi and Ho Chi Minh City); Israel and South Africa (Durban).

Ambassador of India to Thailand

Shringla went on his first Ambassadorial assignment to the Kingdom of Thailand and served for two years from January 2014 to January 2016.

High Commissioner of India to Bangladesh

Shringla served as High Commissioner of India to Bangladesh from January 2016 to January 2019.  During this period, Prime Minister Sheikh Hasina of Bangladesh visited India in April 2017 adding a new chapter to strengthening the bilateral relationship, which Indian Prime Minister Narendra Modi described as heralding of a ‘Sonali Adhyay’ or a Golden Era in the bilateral ties. He is also credited to play important role as co-chair of the India-Bangladesh Joint Boundary Working Group in finalizing the contours of the Land Boundary Agreement with Bangladesh.

Ambassador of India to the United States

Shringla assumed charge as Indian Ambassador to the United States and within two days of his arrival, he presented his credentials to the President of the United States Donald Trump on 11 January 2019. In a short but intense period of just one year, Shringla played an instrumental role in improving the US-India political ties. 

He traveled across the US to expand the reach of his country in the US and became a bridge for people-to-people ties between India and the US. He traveled to 21 US states during his one year tenure where he made a concerted effort to reach out to students, Indian-origin community, working professionals and the government officials at States level.

During his stint in the US, the Howdy Modi event took place in Houston on 22 September 2019 where Indian Prime Minister and the United States President jointly addressed a gathering of over 50,000 people.

Foreign Secretary of India

On 29 January 2020, Shringla assumed the charge of Foreign Secretary of India as the 33rd Foreign Secretary. While addressing media ahead of taking charge, Shringla acknowledged the responsibilities and challenges that came with it and added that he would work under the leadership of Prime Minister and Foreign Affairs Minister of India for a more secure and prosperous India. 

As Foreign Secretary of India, he visited Myanmar in December 2021 and emphasized India's interest in seeing Myanmar's return to democracy at the earliest; release of detainees and prisoners; resolution of issues through dialogue and complete cessation of all violence in relation to the 2021 Myanmar coup d'état.

On April 1, 2022 he was succeeded by Vinay Mohan Kwatra as the 34th Foreign Secretary of India. After his superannuation from the Indian Foreign Service, Shringla is appointed Chief G20 Coordinator for India's G20 Presidency in 2023.

Publications
Shringla has written on a number of topics such as international economy, climate change, preventive diplomacy and India-US bilateral relations, including The United Nations and Conflict Prevention: Balance Between Sovereignty and Action (Indian Journal of International Law) and Project Granite at the New International Airport in Israel (CUTS International, 2011).

Shringla has also contributed articles in newspapers and magazines on a diverse range of topics including an Op-ed piece in The New York Times, India Is Building a More Prosperous Kashmir giving the context and objectives of India's decision to abrogate the temporary Article 370 in Jammu and Kashmir.

Personal life
Shringla is an avid reader and sports enthusiast, with an interest in mountaineering and hockey. He had been on a number of mountain expeditions including to Everest Base Camp, Friendship Peak in Himachal Pradesh. He was a liaison officer for the Kailash Mansarovar Yatra in 1996. He represented St. Stephen's College, Delhi in hockey at inter-college and other tournaments and received College Colors for this.

Shringla was born in Mumbai, to a Buddhist Sikkimese father and a Hindu mother. His father was also part of the Indian civil service. He speaks French, Vietnamese and Nepali apart from English and other Indian languages. He is married to Mrs. Hemal Shringla and has one son.

His surname, Shringla is a birth record misspelling of Tshering la, his father's surname.

Awards and honors
 He was awarded the JT Gibson Award for Outstanding Alumni by Mayo College, Ajmer in 2017.
 The ICFAI University, Sikkim bestowed on him a D. Litt Honoris Causa Honorary Doctorate degree on 9 September 2019.

See also
Vijay Gokhales
List of Mayoites
Dr. S Jaishankar

References

External links
 Foreign Secretary’s Bio Data, Ministry of External Affairs of India, New Delhi, India

1962 births
Living people
People from Mumbai
People from Darjeeling
St. Stephen's College, Delhi alumni
Ambassadors of India to the United States
Indian Foreign Service officers
Mayo College alumni
Ambassadors of India to Thailand
High Commissioners of India to Bangladesh
Indian Foreign Secretaries